Robert Noble (25 May 1949 – May 2005), born in Gosforth, Newcastle upon Tyne, was an English professional footballer. He started his career as a central defender for Newcastle United (although he made no senior appearances), going on loan to Barrow before moving on to Bury, then returned to Barrow on a permanent deal. This was followed by moves to Colchester United, Southport and Darlington. Noble then moved to Australia, playing for Western Suburbs in New South Wales and Inter Monaro.

References

External links
Bobby Noble at Colchester United Archive Database

Bob Noble at Aussie Footballers

1949 births
2005 deaths
Newcastle United F.C. players
Barrow A.F.C. players
Bury F.C. players
Colchester United F.C. players
Southport F.C. players
Darlington F.C. players
English footballers
Association football central defenders
People from Gosforth
Footballers from Tyne and Wear